Meng Yuan, directly translated as Fulfilled Dream, nicknamed Paule, is a male giant panda born on August 31, 2019, in the Berlin Zoo in Germany. Its parents are Sichuan-born Jiao Qing and Meng Meng. They are on lease from China for a provisional period of 15 years.

Meng Yuan and its twin Meng Xiang were the first giant pandas ever born in Germany. Meng Yuan is 48 minutes younger than Meng Xiang and is known for its mischievous, inquisitive nature.

See also
 Meng Xiang

References

2019 animal births
Individual giant pandas
Individual animals in Germany